Distributed Processing Technology (DPT) was founded in 1977, in Maitland, Florida. DPT was an early pioneer in computer storage technology, popularizing the use of disk caching in the 1980s and 1990s. DPT was the first company to design, manufacture and sell microprocessor-based intelligent caching disk controllers to the OEM computer market. Prior to DPT, disk caching technology had been implemented in proprietary hardware in mainframe computing to improve the speed of disk access.

DPT's products popularized the use of disk caching in the 1980s. According to Bill Brothers, Unix product manager at the Santa Cruz Operation (SCO), a computer operating system vendor, "The kind of performance those guys (DPT) produce is phenomenal. It's unlike any other product on the market."

DPT was founded by Steve Goldman, who served as the President and Chief Executive Officer until DPT was acquired by Adaptec in November 1999.

External links 
Floppy controller speeds access with cache
Caching Disk Controller Relieves System Bottlenecks
Disk Controller Unburdens Real Time Applications

References

Computer companies established in 1977
Computer companies disestablished in 1999
Defunct computer companies of the United States
Defunct computer hardware companies
1977 establishments in Florida
1999 disestablishments in Florida